Pogonocherus hispidus is a species of beetle in the family Cerambycidae. It was described by Carl Linnaeus in 1758, originally under the genus Cerambyx. It has a wide distribution throughout Europe and North Africa. It contains the varietas Pogonocherus hispidus var. rufescens.

P. hispidus feeds on Cornus sanguinea, Corylus avellana, Ilex aquifolium, Hedera helix, and Euonymus europaeus. It serves as a parasitoid for several wasp species, including Dolichomitus agnoscendus, Eurytoma morio, Ephialtes manifestator, Lestricus secalis, and Cenocoelius aartseni.

References

Pogonocherini
Beetles described in 1758